Good Stuff may refer to:

Good Stuff, an album by The B-52's
"Good Stuff" (The B-52's song), this album's title track
"Good Stuff" (Kelis song)
"The Good Stuff", a song by Kenny Chesney
"Good Stuff", a song by Clor
 "Good Stuff", a song by Griff
"Good Stuff", a song by Shakira from the album She Wolf
The Good Stuff, an album by Peter Mulvey
The Good Stuff, a video playlist webseries created by Craig Benzine